The Penn State University Libraries consists of 36 libraries at 22 locations in the Commonwealth of Pennsylvania. The two main buildings on Penn State's University Park campus are the Pattee and Paterno libraries.

History
The library's first permanent location was in Old Main, with 1,500 books in agriculture and the sciences.  In 1904, the library was moved to the Carnegie Building (then "Carnegie Library"), which provided a 50,000 book capacity.

By 1940, the library's collection had grown to 150,000, overcrowding Carnegie by three times its capacity.  The library was permanently moved to the Pattee Library building.  By the 1960s, the collection had grown to 800,000 books.

The Pattee Library was renovated in the late 1990s, and in 2000, it was rededicated along with the new Paterno Library, a portion of which comprises the former East Wing of Pattee. Today, there are 14 libraries at the University Park campus alone, and the Libraries boast a collection of more than 5.4 million volumes.

Pattee Library

Pattee Library is named for Fred Lewis Pattee, regarded as the first professor of American Literature (1895–1928) and author of the Penn State Alma Mater. Pattee Library was built as part of a Public Works Administration-General State Authority project. Construction took place over 1937-1940.  Between 1940 and 1973, the library was expanded three times. The "Stacks" or Stack Building was added in 1953, "West Pattee" in 1966, and "East Pattee" in 1973. A renovation which included the construction of the Paterno Library began in 1998, and was completed in 2000.

The Pattee Library includes the circulation area for both libraries, which connects the original mall entrance with the Curtin Road entrance. In fall 2010, a Reading Room housing the Leisure Reading Collection on the first floor of Pattee Library opened in the Tombros/McWhirter Knowledge Commons. Another major feature of Pattee, on the second floor, is the Paterno Family Humanities Reading Room, a large reading room reminiscent of historical libraries, and the design was based on images of the New York Public Library legal collections room.

Pattee Library is home to the Arts and Humanities Library, Music and Media Center, Library Learning Services, Maps Library, Media Commons, Digitization and Preservation, Course Reserves Services, Disabilities Services, and News and Microforms Library.

It is located in the Farmers' High School Historic District added to the National Register of Historic Places in 1981.

Paterno Library
In 1983, as Penn State football coach Joe Paterno was being honored for his first national championship, he gave a speech challenging the university's Board of Trustees to make Penn State number one in academics as well as athletics.  He specifically targeted the need for a top-quality library, stating, "Without a great library, you can't have a great university." In 1993, he and his wife Sue began a campaign which raised $13.75 million for the construction of a new library. The groundbreaking for the library, named the Paterno Library in their honor, took place in April 1997. Paterno has also donated several million of his own money towards the library.

Construction was completed in fall 2000, and the building was dedicated on September 8, 2000.  The building is connected to the Pattee Library, and shares a common circulation desk.  The former East Wing of Pattee forms a portion of the Paterno Library. Paterno Library is home to the Business, Education and Behavioral Sciences, Life Sciences, Social Sciences, and Special Collections libraries.

Other Libraries
Other libraries at the University Park campus include:
Architecture and Landscape Architecture Library (Stuckeman Family Building)
Earth and Mineral Sciences Library (Deike Building)  This library is named in honor of * *  Fletcher L. Byrom, a college alumnus.
Engineering Library (Hammond Building)
Physical and Mathematical Sciences Library (Davey Building)

There are 22 additional libraries in the system, each in a separate campus location of the Penn State University.
Penn State Harrisburg Library

References

Pattee Library and Paterno Library
University Park Libraries History

Libraries
Pennsylvania State University campus
University and college academic libraries in the United States
Library buildings completed in 1904
Carnegie libraries in Pennsylvania
Libraries in Pennsylvania
1857 establishments in Pennsylvania